The tree kingfishers, also called wood kingfishers or Halcyoninae, are the most numerous of the three subfamilies of birds in the kingfisher family, with around 70 species divided into 12 genera, including several species of kookaburras. The subfamily appears to have arisen in Indochina and Maritime Southeast Asia and then spread to many areas around the world. Tree kingfishers are widespread through Asia and Australasia, but also appear in Africa and the islands of the Pacific and Indian Oceans, using a range of habitats from tropical rainforest to open woodlands.

The tree kingfishers  are short-tailed, large-headed, compact birds with long, pointed bills. Like other Coraciiformes, they are brightly coloured.  Most are monogamous and territorial, nesting in holes in trees or termite nests. Both parents incubate the eggs and feed the chicks. Although some tree kingfishers frequent wetlands, none are specialist fish-eaters. Most species dive onto prey from a perch, mainly taking slow-moving invertebrates or small vertebrates.

Taxonomy 
The tree kingfisher subfamily is often given the name Daceloninae introduce by Charles Lucien Bonaparte in 1841, but the name Halcyoninae introduced by Nicholas Aylward Vigors in 1825 is earlier and has priority.

The subfamily Halcyoninae is one of three subfamilies in the kingfisher family Alcedinidae. The other two are Alcedininae and Cerylinae. The subfamily contains around 70 species divided into 12 genera. A molecular study published in 2017 found that the genera Dacelo and Actenoides as currently defined are paraphyletic. The shovel-billed kookaburra in the monotypic genus Clytoceyx sits within Dacelo and the glittering kingfisher in the monotypic genus Caridonax lies within Actenoides.

List of species 

 Genus Actenoides
 Green-backed kingfisher, Actenoides monachus
 Scaly-breasted kingfisher, Actenoides princeps
 Moustached kingfisher, Actenoides bougainvillei
 Spotted wood kingfisher, Actenoides lindsayi
 Hombron's kingfisher, Actenoides hombroni
 Rufous-collared kingfisher, Actenoides concretus
 Genus Melidora
 Hook-billed kingfisher, Melidora macrorrhina
 Genus Lacedo
 Banded kingfisher, Lacedo pulchella

 Genus Tanysiptera, paradise kingfishers
 Common paradise kingfisher, Tanysiptera galatea
 Kofiau paradise kingfisher, Tanysiptera ellioti
 Biak paradise kingfisher, Tanysiptera riedelii
 Numfor paradise kingfisher, Tanysiptera carolinae
 Little paradise kingfisher, Tanysiptera hydrocharis
 Buff-breasted paradise kingfisher, Tanysiptera sylvia
 Black-capped paradise kingfisher, Tanysiptera nigriceps
 Red-breasted paradise kingfisher, Tanysiptera nympha
 Brown-headed paradise kingfisher, Tanysiptera danae
 Genus Cittura
 Sulawesi lilac kingfisher, Cittura cyanotis
 Sangihe lilac kingfisher, Cittura sanghirensis
 Genus Clytoceyx
 Shovel-billed kookaburra, Clytoceyx rex
 Genus Dacelo, kookaburras
 Laughing kookaburra, Dacelo novaeguineae
 Blue-winged kookaburra, Dacelo leachii
 Spangled kookaburra, Dacelo tyro
 Rufous-bellied kookaburra, Dacelo gaudichaud
 Genus Caridonax
 Glittering kingfisher, Caridonax fulgidus
 Genus Pelargopsis
 Stork-billed kingfisher, Pelargopsis capensis
 Great-billed kingfisher, Pelargopsis melanorhyncha
 Brown-winged kingfisher, Pelargopsis amauroptera

 Genus Halcyon
 Ruddy kingfisher, Halcyon coromanda
 White-throated kingfisher, Halcyon smyrnensis
 Brown-breasted kingfisher, Halcyon gularis
 Javan kingfisher, Halcyon cyanoventris
 Chocolate-backed kingfisher, Halcyon badia
 Black-capped kingfisher, Halcyon pileata
 Grey-headed kingfisher, Halcyon leucocephala
 Brown-hooded kingfisher, Halcyon albiventris
 Striped kingfisher, Halcyon chelicuti
 Blue-breasted kingfisher, Halcyon malimbica
 Woodland kingfisher, Halcyon senegalensis
 Mangrove kingfisher, Halcyon senegaloides
 Genus Todirhamphus
 Blue-black kingfisher, Todirhamphus nigrocyaneus
 Winchell's kingfisher, Todirhamphus winchelli
 Blue-and-white kingfisher, Todirhamphus diops
 Lazuli kingfisher, Todirhamphus lazuli
 Forest kingfisher, Todirhamphus macleayii
 White-mantled kingfisher, Todirhamphus albonotatus
 Ultramarine kingfisher, Todirhamphus leucopygius
 Vanuatu kingfisher, Todirhamphus farquhari
 Sombre kingfisher, Todirhamphus funebris
 Collared kingfisher, Todirhamphus chloris
 Torresian kingfisher, Todirhamphus sordidus
 Islet kingfisher, Todirhamphus colonus
 Mariana kingfisher, Todirhamphus albicilla
 Melanesian kingfisher, Todirhamphus tristrami
 Pacific kingfisher, Todirhamphus sacer
 Talaud kingfisher, Todirhamphus enigma
 Guam kingfisher, Todirhamphus cinnamominus
 Rusty-capped kingfisher, Todiramphus pelewensis
 Pohnpei kingfisher, Todiramphus reichenbachii
 Beach kingfisher, Todirhamphus saurophaga
 Sacred kingfisher, Todirhamphus sanctus
 Flat-billed kingfisher, Todirhamphus recurvirostris
 Cinnamon-banded kingfisher, Todirhamphus australasia
 Chattering kingfisher, Todirhamphus tuta
 Mewing kingfisher, Todirhamphus ruficollaris
 Society kingfisher, Todirhamphus veneratus
 Mangareva kingfisher, Todirhamphus gambieri
 Niau kingfisher, Todirhamphus gertrudae
 Marquesan kingfisher, Todirhamphus godeffroyi
 Red-backed kingfisher, Todirhamphus pyrrhopygia
 Genus Syma
 Yellow-billed kingfisher, Syma torotoro
 Mountain kingfisher, Syma megarhyncha

Description 
Kingfishers are short-tailed, large-headed, compact birds with long, pointed bills. Like other Coraciiformes, they are brightly coloured. The tree kingfishers are medium to large species, mostly typical kingfishers in appearance, although shovel-billed kookaburra has a huge conical bill, and the  Tanysiptera paradise kingfishers have long tail streamers. Some species, notably the kookaburras, show sexual dimorphism.

Distribution and habitat 
Most tree kingfishers are found in the warm climates of Africa,  southern and southeast Asia, and Australasia.  No members of this family are found in the Americas. The origin of the family is thought to have been in tropical Australasia, which still has the most species.

Tree kingfishers use a range of habitats from tropical rainforest to open woodlands and thornbush country. Many are not closely tied to water, and can be found in arid areas of Australia and Africa.

Breeding 

Tree kingfishers are monogamous and territorial, although some species, including three kookaburras, have a cooperative breeding system involving young from earlier broods. The nest is a tree hole, either natural, and old woodpecker nest, or excavated in soft or rotting wood by the kingfishers. Several species dig holes in termite nests. No nest material is added, although litter may build up over the years. Both parents incubate the eggs and feed the chicks. Egg laying is staggered at one-day intervals so that if food is short, only the older, larger nestlings get fed. The chicks are naked, blind, and helpless when they hatch, and stand on their heels, unlike adults.

Feeding 
Although some tree kingfishers, such as the black-capped kingfisher, frequent wetlands, none are specialist fishers. Most species are watch-and-wait hunters which dive onto prey from a perch, mainly taking slow-moving invertebrates or small vertebrates. The shovel-billed kookaburra digs through leaf litter for worms and other prey, and the Vanuatu kingfisher feeds exclusively on insects and spiders. Several other western Pacific species are also mainly insectivorous and flycatch for prey. As with the other kingfisher families, insectivorous species tend to have flattened, red bills to assist in the capture of insects.

References

Sources

External links 

 Kingfisher videos on the Internet Bird Collection

Kingfishers

th:Tree kingfisher